"Don't Let the Man Get You Down" is a song by English electronic music producer Fatboy Slim, released on 4 July 2005 as the fourth and final single from his fourth studio album Palookaville (2004). It samples the opening line of the song "Signs" by Five Man Electrical Band.

The song peaked at number 153 on the UK Singles Chart.

Music video 

The music video is in the style of a black and white public service announcement. It starts off with the title 'A film by Neighborhood Watch (The End is Near)' then it switches to a white man named Don, and it states that 'Don likes to fish' and 'Don is a racist'. Throughout the video, it shows Don living a day in his life showing hatred, disdain, and distrust of non-whites. A figure in black, thought to be the figure on the 'This is a Neighborhood Watch Community' sign, is seen stalking Don in the background during the scenes in the parking lot, water fountain and Mexican restaurant scenes. After shooing some dark-skinned kids off of his boat, he furiously marches across the street and is hit by a car, dropping his prized fishing trophy. As an Asian man sees him and calls 911.  White lettering states 'Look both ways before crossing the street', 'And don't be a racist', and 'or else'.

Track listing
 "Don't Let the Man Get You Down" – 4:01
 "Don't Let the Man Get You Down" (Justice Remix) – 4:01

Charts 

2005 singles
Fatboy Slim songs
Songs written by Norman Cook
2004 songs
Skint Records singles